The 1919 Drexel Dragons football team represented Drexel Institute—now known as Drexel University—in the 1919 college football season. Led by W. L. Ridpath in this first and only season as head coach, the team compiled a record of 0–4.

Schedule

Roster

References

Drexel
Drexel Dragons football seasons
College football winless seasons
Drexel Dragons football